Inder Puri is a small colony located in the central part of New Delhi. It lies between Naraina and New Rajinder Nagar area; it is located next to the renowned Pusa Institute.

Access
The Indira Gandhi International Airport is 12 km (domestic) and 16 km (international) from Inderpuri. The New Delhi railway station is 11 km away, and the Hazrat Nizamuddin Railway Station 19 km away. The Blue Line of the Delhi Metro has a stop at the Shadipur station within 3.4 km from Inderpuri. The closest metro station is Pink line metro station at Naraina Vihar within 1 km approximately.

Politics 
Inderpuri comes under the jurisdiction of Rajinder Nagar (Delhi Assembly constituency). The current MLA is Durgesh Pathak of Aam Aadmi Party.

See also
 Neighbourhoods of Delhi

References 

Neighbourhoods in Delhi
Central Delhi district
Villages in Central Delhi district